Valerianus or Valerian the Elder was Roman Emperor from 253 AD to 260 AD.

Valerianus is a name also held by:

 Valerian II (Publius Licinius Cornelius Valerianus; died 258), Roman Caesar, son of Emperor Gallienus and grandson of Emperor Valerian
 Valerianus Minor (died 268), son of the emperor Valerian
 Marius Valerianus (3rd century), Roman governor of Britannia Inferior
 Valerianus, Archbishop of Aquileia (369-388)
 Valerianus, a bishop of the Ancient Diocese of Auxerre
 Priscus Valerianus (fl. c. 450-456), Roman praetorian prefect
 Valerianus Magnus (1586–1661), Italian Capuchin missionary preacher in central Europe

See also
 Valer (disambiguation)
 Valera (disambiguation)
 Valeria (gens)
 Valeria (given name)
 Valerian (name)
 Valeriano
 Valerie (given name)
 Valérien (disambiguation)
 Valerius (name)